Membrane progesterone receptor delta (mPRδ), or progestin and adipoQ receptor 6 (PAQR6), is a protein that in humans is encoded by the PAQR6 gene.

See also
 Membrane progesterone receptor
 Progestin and adipoQ receptor

References

7TM receptors